SIH may refer to:

Scottish Ice Hockey, the governing body for ice hockey in Scotland
Shifa International Hospital, Islamabad, Pakistan
Singapore Islamic Hub, a religious campus in Singapore
Siu Hong station, Hong Kong, MTR station code
St Helier railway station, London, National Rail station code